Mint sauce is a green sauce originating in the United Kingdom, made from finely chopped spearmint (Mentha spicata) leaves soaked in vinegar, and a small amount of sugar. Lime juice is sometimes added. The sauce based on mint and vinegar has a rather thin consistency and is flecked with chopped leaves of the herb. In British and Irish cuisine it is often served as a condiment for roast lamb or, in some areas, mushy peas. 

It is often purchased ready-made, being easy to find in British food shops. A popular alternative is Mint jelly, which is of a thicker consistency and sweeter than mint sauce.

Similar herb-based green sauces were common throughout Medieval Europe, with the use of mint being more common in French and Italian cuisine of the period than that of the English; however, they became less common and mostly died out as Europe entered the Modern Era.

Variations

Mint chutney is a mint based sauce which is served with Indian snacks and breakfast items like Idly, Dhokla, etc. It is made with ground fresh mint leaves with a variety of ingredients like cilantro, green chili, lemon juice (in the northern parts of India) or tamarind (in southern India), salt, fried bengal gram and optionally curd.

In Tunisia a similar sauce is made out of dried mint and can be served with a méchoui, a mulukhiyah or as a base for a vinaigrette. Dried and fresh mint are also part of several dishes of Tunisian cuisine.

Mint sauces may include fruits in their preparation, such as raspberries.

See also

 List of sauces
 Chutney in South Asian cuisine may be made with mint

References

External links 

Sauces
British condiments